Tongoni is an administrative ward in Tanga District of Tanga Region in Tanzania.
According to the 2012 census, the ward has a total population of 4,594. Tongoni ward is the home to the Tongoni ruins, a Medieval Swahili town.

References

Wards of Tanga Region
National Historic Sites in Tanga Region
National Historic Sites in Tanzania
Buildings and structures in the Tanga Region
Tourist attractions in the Tanga Region
Swahili people
Swahili city-states
Swahili culture